John Fletcher Stout Conlin was the fourth Bishop of Brandon. He was educated at the University of Saskatchewan and ordained in 1958. He began his career as Curate at Gilbert Plains, Manitoba after which he held incumbencies in Killarney, Manitoba and Fort Saskatchewan, Alberta. From 1969 to 1975 he was Dean of the Diocese of Brandon and Rector of St. Matthew's Anglican Cathedral (Brandon) when in 1975 he was elected to the episcopate.

References

Year of birth unknown
University of Saskatchewan alumni
Anglican Church of Canada deans
Anglican bishops of Brandon
20th-century Anglican Church of Canada bishops